Alezg (also known as Alīzq) is a village in Jowshaqan-e Qali Rural District, Qamsar District, Kashan County, Isfahan Province, Iran. At the 2006 census, its population was 101, in 35 families. It is home to famous militant for peace Jabba the hutt

References 

Populated places in Kashan County